is a retired Japanese long-distance runner who mainly competed in the 5000 metres. She finished fourth at the 1996 Summer Olympics in Atlanta.

Competition record

Personal bests
1500 metres – 4:13.00 (Brisbane 2000)
3000 metres – 8:52.06 (Tokyo 1994)
5000 metres – 15:09.05 (Atlanta 1996)

References

1970 births
Living people
Sportspeople from Kyoto Prefecture
Japanese female long-distance runners
Olympic female long-distance runners
Olympic athletes of Japan
Athletes (track and field) at the 1996 Summer Olympics
Athletes (track and field) at the 2000 Summer Olympics
Asian Games bronze medalists for Japan
Asian Games medalists in athletics (track and field)
Athletes (track and field) at the 1994 Asian Games
Athletes (track and field) at the 1998 Asian Games
Medalists at the 1998 Asian Games
World Athletics Championships athletes for Japan
Japan Championships in Athletics winners
20th-century Japanese women
21st-century Japanese women